Homerun is the fifth studio album released by the hard rock band Gotthard.

The album peaked at #1 in the Swiss charts and was certified as 3× Platinum for exceeding 90,000 sales.

This is Gotthard's best-selling album. It has sold nearly 120,000 copies in Switzerland only.

Track listing

Personnel
Steve Lee – vocals 
Leo Leoni – guitar and vocals
Mandy Meyer – guitar
Marc Lynn – bass guitar
Hena Habegger – drums and percussion

Charts

Weekly charts

Year-end charts

References

External links
 Swisscharts
Heavy Harmonies page

Gotthard (band) albums
2001 albums